Eichstaettia is an extinct genus of prehistoric bony fish that lived during the early Toarcian stage of the Early Jurassic epoch.

See also

 Prehistoric fish
 List of prehistoric bony fish

References

Early Jurassic fish
Elopiformes